Melissa González may refer to:

 Melissa González (actress) (born 1980), American actress
 Melissa Gonzalez (hurdler) (born 1994), Colombian-American 400 m hurdler
 Melissa González (field hockey) (born 1989), American field hockey player